The Godfather's Daughter Mafia Blues is a 1991 Hong Kong action film directed by Fung Hark-On, who also served as the film's action director and appears in a supporting role, and starring Alex Man, Yukari Oshima, Mark Cheng and Dick Wei.

Plot 
Wai (Mark Cheng), a new immigrant from mainland China, works at a fish raft with his friend Nam (Benny Lai). In China, Wai served in the People's Liberation Army's special forces where he was trained intensively in Chinese Kung Fu. One time during a misunderstanding, Wai meets Lee Wah-yu (Alex Man), mastermind of a financial group and triad boss, and becomes Lee's follower.

Tetsuya is the leader of Japan's Yamaguchi-gumi gang and Lee's business partner in Hong Kong and always had pleasant cooperation with Lee. After Tetsuya dies, his son Kuyama (Ken Lo) inherits his position. Kuyama, who is reckless, arrogant and greedy, hopes to use financial power to strike down Lee. In order to prevent his followers from being ruined for life, Lee was forced to deploy cash from his own company to purchase Kuyama's stock rights. Tung (Dick Wei) was Lee's sworn brother in the past who secretly used public funds of the company to run a smuggling business in China. However, his smuggling business was a failure where he went broke and attempts to flee when he was unable to give an explanation to Lee. In order to reduce the outrage of other sworn brothers, Lee wounded Tung's leg with a gunshot.

Amy (Yukari Oshima), Lee's only daughter, returns after studying abroad in Japan. Discontented with Kuyama's actions, Amy confronts him where she injures his face. Holding a grudge, Kuyama conspires with Tung to murder Lee. After Lee died, Wai and Amy investigates into it and find out that Lee was murdered by Kuyama and Tung and were determined to seek revenge. After repeated struggles, Wai and Amy finally eliminates the enemy and traitor together.

Cast
Alex Man as Master Lee Wah-yu
Yukari Oshima as Amy Lee
Mark Cheng as Wai
Dick Wei as Master Tung
Ken Lo as Kuyama
Benny Lai as Nam
Tung Chi
Fung Hark-On as Kak
Wong Yue as Mr. Hung
Steve Mak as Policeman
Peter Yang as Senior in Lee Wah-yu's triad (cameo)
Bryan Leung as  Senior in Lee Wah-yu's triad (cameo)
Fung Fung as Uncle Fung (cameo)
Tai Po
Wynn Lau as Master Yung
Fong Yau
Chow Fong
Ko Shut-fung as Kuyama's thug
Foo Wang-tat as Mr. Yamada
Ho Tung
Mark King
Fung So-po
Anthony Chung
Tong Pau-ching
Lee Fat-yuen
To Wai-wo
Lai Sing-kwong
Lam Foo-wai as Lee Wah-yu's thug
Leung Hung as Uncle
Ho Chi-moon as Club customer
Ling Chi-hung as Lee Wah-yu's thug
Christopher Chan as Lee Wah-yu's thug
Cheng Chi-ho as Bodyguard
Lau Chi-ming as Rascal
Pang Hiu-sang as Rascal
Louis Keung as Kuyama's thug
Chan Tat-kwong
Chu Tau
Hon Chun

Reception

Critical
The 14 Amazons gave the film a score of 8/10 and praised its plot and action scenes and wrote, "The consistency and attention to detail in the movie show that a lot of care and effort went into its production." Trash Cinema Club rated the film three and a half stars out of five and praised the action scenes and acting from the cast but criticized the inconsistencies that occur later in the film.

Box office
The film grossed HK$1,403,609 at the Hong Kong box office during its theatrical run from 31 October to 6 November 1991 in Hong Kong.

References

External links

The Godfather's Daughter Mafia Blues at Hong Kong Cinemagic

1991 films
1991 action films
1991 martial arts films
1990s crime drama films
Hong Kong action films
Hong Kong martial arts films
Gun fu films
Triad films
Yakuza films
1990s Cantonese-language films
Films set in Hong Kong
Films shot in Hong Kong
1991 drama films
1990s Japanese films
1990s Hong Kong films